Donald John Tyson (April 21, 1930 – January 6, 2011) was an American businessman who was the President and CEO of Tyson Foods during its rise to the top of the food business.

Early life
Donald J. Tyson was born in Olathe, Kansas. He attended the public schools in Springdale, Arkansas, and completed his education at Kemper Military School in Boonville, Missouri, and at the University of Arkansas in Fayetteville, Arkansas, where he became a member of Sigma Nu Fraternity. He left the University of Arkansas before earning his degree.

In 1944, at age 14, Tyson was first introduced into the poultry industry as a chicken catcher and truck driver at Tyson's Feed and Hatchery, the family's poultry feed and live production business started by his father, John W. Tyson. In 1952, Don Tyson left the University of Arkansas to join his father in expanding the business. The company opened its first poultry processing plant in 1958 on Randall Road in Springdale, with Don Tyson serving as the first plant manager.

President and CEO
Tyson was named president of Tyson Foods, Inc. in 1966. He served as the company's CEO and chairman from 1967 to 1991, as its chairman from 1991 to 1995, and as its senior chairman from 1995 until his retirement in 2001. During his tenure, the company's revenue increased from $51 million to more than $10 billion, and Tyson Foods grew to become one of the largest manufacturing companies in the world. According to associates, Tyson enjoyed his job. In his retirement, Tyson continued to serve as a consultant to the company and as a member of its board of directors. His son, John H. Tyson was the CEO of Tyson Foods from 1999 to 2006 and is currently chairman.

Wealth
According to Forbes magazine, Tyson was one of the world's 1,000 richest people with a net worth over a billion dollars in March 2007.

An avid fisherman, Tyson served on the Boards of Directors of the Billfish Foundation and the International Game Fish Association.

Death
Tyson died on January 6, 2011, from cancer. He was 80 years old.

References

1930 births
2011 deaths
People from Olathe, Kansas
People from Springdale, Arkansas
Arkansas Democrats
Deaths from cancer in Arkansas
20th-century American businesspeople
Tyson Foods people